iStock is an online royalty free, international micro stock photography provider based in Calgary, Alberta, Canada. The firm offers millions of photos, illustrations, clip art, videos and audio tracks. Artists, designers and photographers worldwide contribute their work to iStock collections in return for royalties.  Nearly half a million new photos, illustrations, videos and audio files, are added each month.

History 

The company was founded by Bruce Livingstone in May 2000, as iStockphoto, a free stock imagery website supported by Livingstone's web development firm, Evolvs Media. iStock pioneered the crowd-sourced stock industry and became the original source for user-generated stock photos, vectors and illustrations, and video clips. It began charging money in 2001 and quickly became profitable.

On February 9, 2006, the firm was acquired by Getty Images for $50 million USD. Livingstone promised that the site would continue "functioning independently with the benefits of Getty Images, yet, very importantly for them and us, autonomy."

On September 18, 2006, the site experienced the first benefits of the new ownership: a Controlled vocabulary keyword taxonomy borrowed from Getty Images.

As of March 31, 2007, iStockpro closed. iStockpro was a more expensive version of iStockphoto that was never as popular as iStockphoto, and became redundant after the acquisition by Getty Images.

On April 1, 2008 Getty Images disclosed, as part of its agreement to be sold to a private equity firm, that iStockphoto's revenue in 2007 was $71.9 million USD of which $20.9 million (29%) was paid to contributors.

Founder and CEO Livingstone left iStockphoto in 2009. He went on to co-found competitor Stocksy United in 2013.

In 2013, iStockphoto was rebranded as iStock by Getty Images, removing the word 'photo' to convey that the company offers stock media other than just photography, such as vector illustrations, audio, and video.

In 2020, iStock began offering weekly complimentary stock photos from its exclusive Signature collection, as well as monthly free illustrations and video clips.

Contributors 

iStock works with over 300,000 contributors globally, thousands of which are exclusive and create content solely for the platform. Contributing photographers apply by uploading 3-6 sample images, illustrations, or videos to the Contributor by Getty Images app, which is available on App Store and Google Play. The content is reviewed and if successful, applicants are invited to become either a Getty Images or iStock contributor.

Contributors receive royalties each time their content is licensed. Royalty rates start at 15% for photos and 20% for illustrations and videos, with exclusive contributors earning between 25% and 45%.

In an address to its community entitled "2008: A Year in Review and a Look Ahead″, the firm's CEO mentioned that the company was paying out ‘almost’ $1.1 million per week in royalty payments to contributors.

Purchasing and use 
Each approved image is added to the searchable online database, where it can be found by purchasers.  Content is also grouped by collections and searchable via filters such as age, ethnicity and visual dimensions. Files can be downloaded immediately, and used for personal, business or commercial purposes.  iStock offers subscription plans to suit varying needs and budgets or offers the opportunity to purchase credit packs for any asset, from any collection.

The basic license agreement prohibits some uses, such as logo or trademarks or adult materials, etc. Print runs over 500,000 requires an extended license. Extended licenses are available for purchase to cover needs not met by the basic license agreement.

Each license file comes with a $10,000 legal guarantee, protecting users against copyright infringement.  It's also possible to purchase an additional Extended Legal Guarantee to increase coverage to $250,000.

Products 
iStock offers two types of collections, Signature and Essential. The Signature collection offers high-quality visuals, exclusive to iStock and The Essential collection offers more affordable non-exclusive visuals.

Visuals are grouped by hand-curated sets for ease of search and can be edited using the iStock Editor tool.

Ownership of material controversy 

The 2011 film The Roommate obtained photos from iStockPhoto for its promotional material. One of the photos used as its backdrop was the Christy Administration Building from Southwestern College in Winfield, Kansas. The college administration voiced concern that permission to use the photograph of the building was not properly obtained and is investigating the legality of its use.  As of February 8, 2011, no lawsuits have been filed but discussions continue to take place.

iStockvideo 
On July 31, 2006 iStockphoto announced the development of a new branch, iStockvideo, to sell stock video clips in a variety of formats from web-size, through NTSC and PAL up to HDV and HD sizes.

iStock currently offers over 8 million video clips.

iStockalypse event 
The iStockalypse was founded in 2005, as an official multi-day iStock photography event offering premium training. It is held several times a year for contributing artists and photographers.

Since the first event in Las Vegas, iStock has visited Seattle, Boston, Ljubljana, Prague, Austin, Barcelona, Marseilles, Buenos Aires, Malta, Berlin, Calgary, Istanbul, Cannes, Tokyo, London, Milan, Singapore, Sao Paulo, Los Angeles and Paris. In March 2015 the event was organized in Dubai to get authentic, local shots of the city and its people.

Grants 
iStock is part of the wider Getty Images Inc. Grants program and, as of 2020, has supported the photojournalism and photography communities, including emerging photographers, with over $1.7 million in financial grants.

In 2020, iStock awarded three grants of US$10,000, $7,000 and $3,000, to three young creatives as part of its latest Creative Bursary, “Definition Future.” In the wake of COVID-19 and the countless challenges creatives continued to face, the bursary provided financial support and mentorship, offering the three emerging creatives the financial freedom to explore what complexities the future may hold through the lens of creative visual storytelling.

Publicity 
In 2015, the film Unfinished Business, starring Vince Vaughn, used images from iStock as part of their PR campaign. Images of the actors were superimposed onto stock photos of office workers which were available for the public to download. The campaign generated significant social media and press attention.

References

External links 

 

2000 establishments in Canada
Companies based in Calgary
Internet properties established in 2000
Online content distribution
Crowdsourcing
Getty Images
Online companies of Canada
Privately held companies of Canada
Stock photography
Photo archives in Canada